Chen Ding (born August 5, 1992, in Baoshan, Yunnan, China) is a Chinese racewalker who won a gold medal in the 2012 Summer Olympics in London, United Kingdom. He finished the race in 1:18:46, a new Olympic record. He also won a gold medal in the 2013 World Championships in Athletics after the original gold medalist was disqualified for doping.

2012 London Olympics
In the 2012 London Games, Chen became the first Chinese athlete ever to win an Olympic gold medal in 20 km racewalk event. He is also the second Chinese male athlete to win a gold medal in any athletic event of the Olympics, after Liu Xiang's gold in 110 m hurdles at the 2004 Summer Olympics in Athens. Chen finished the race in 1:18:46 and established a new Olympic record. He achieved this feat one day before his birthday and considered it as a "wonderful gift".  His teammates Wang Zhen and Cai Zelin finished third and fourth, with Guatemala's Erick Barrondo in second.

See also
 China at the 2012 Summer Olympics - Athletics
 Athletics at the 2012 Summer Olympics – Men's 20 kilometres walk

References

External links
 

1992 births
Living people
Chinese male racewalkers
Olympic gold medalists for China
Athletes (track and field) at the 2012 Summer Olympics
Athletes (track and field) at the 2016 Summer Olympics
Olympic athletes of China
Athletes from Yunnan
Medalists at the 2012 Summer Olympics
South China University of Technology alumni
World Athletics Championships athletes for China
World Athletics Championships medalists
Olympic gold medalists in athletics (track and field)
World Athletics Championships winners